929: Tanakh B'yachad (Hebrew: Bible Together, 929 - תנך ביחד) is a project for learning one chapter of Tanakh per day (except Friday and Saturday), totaling 5 chapters per week. The name '929' refers to the total number of chapters in the Tanakh.

The project was announced by the Israeli Education Ministry, and began on December 21, 2014. The first cycle was completed on April 18, 2018, coinciding with Israel's 70th Independence Day.

The first cycle of the project offered content in Hebrew only. The second cycle, which began on July 15, 2018, offers some content in English as well. It concluded on February 2, 2022. The third cycle began on February 6, 2022.

See also
Other study cycles, under Torah study#Study cycles.

References

External links 

 Official website 

Israeli educational websites
Hebrew Bible studies
Jewish educational organizations
Judaism websites